Saint Stanislaus Roman Catholic Church Complex is a historic Roman Catholic church complex at 42, 46, 50 Cornell Street, and 73 Reid Street in Amsterdam, Montgomery County, New York.  The complex consists of four contributing buildings:

St. Stanislaus Church – 50-52 Cornell St., established 1894, built 1897, designed by Edward W. Loth, enlarged 1912;
St. Stanislaus School – 42-44 Cornell St., founded 1897, built 1905–1906, designed by C. B. Machold, closed 2011;
Felician Sisters convent – 46 Cornell Street, built 1934, now the Saint John Paul II Parish Center; and
rectory – 73 Reid Street, built 1940–41, Georgian style.

The church is a "T" shaped brick building on a foundation of cut limestone. A transept was added in 1912.  It features an engaged bell tower with pyramidal roof and finials.

The complex was added to the National Register of Historic Places in 1999.

Gallery

References

External links 

 St. Stanislaus Roman Catholic Church of Amsterdam, NY U.S.A.

Roman Catholic churches in New York (state)
Churches on the National Register of Historic Places in New York (state)
Gothic Revival church buildings in New York (state)
Roman Catholic churches completed in 1897
19th-century Roman Catholic church buildings in the United States
Churches in Montgomery County, New York
Roman Catholic parishes of Diocese of Albany
National Register of Historic Places in Montgomery County, New York